Garut Regency is a Regency in the West Java province of Indonesia. It covers an area of 3,065.19 km2 (1,186.91 mi2). Geographically, it lies between 6°57′34″ – 7°44′57″ South latitude and 107°24′34″ – 108°7′34″ East longitude. The population at the 2010 census was 2,404,121, and at the 2020 census was 2,585,607; the official estimate as at mid 2021 was 2,604,787. South Tarogong (Tarogong Kidul) is the regency seat.

Adjacent regencies
It is bordered by: 
 Eastern side: Tasikmalaya Regency
 Western side: Cianjur Regency and Bandung Regency
 Northern side: Sumedang Regency
 Southern side: Indian Ocean

Geography
In general, Garut has a cool but tropical climate, with an average temperature of 24 °C (76 °F). Average annual rainfall is 2,590 mm (102 inches). This area includes valley territory surrounded by volcanoes (Mount Karacak: 1,838 m, Mount Cikuray: 2,821 m, Mount Guntur: 2,249 m, Mount Papandayan: 2,622 m) on the northern side, with average heights of 700–750 m above sea level. Streams of solidified lava are present on their slopes.

Administrative Districts
Garut Regency is currently divided into 42 districts (kecamatan), listed below with their areas and populations at the 2010 and 2020 censuses, together with the official estimates as at mid 2021. The table also includes the locations of the district administrative centres, the number of villages (rural desa and urban kelurahan) in each district, and its post code. 

However, in 2013 the National Legislative Council approved a proposal to create a new Regency - South Garut Regency (Kabupaten Garut Selatan) - to include the 16 southernmost districts (those listed first in the table below) of the existing Garut Regency, with a combined population of 676,940 in mid 2021. The new Regency would thus inherit 63% of the land area of the existing regency, but only 26% of its population in 2021. As at 2022, this proposal has not yet been implemented.

Note: (a) except the desa of Cangkuang, which has a post code of 44119.

Administratively, the 42 districts are subdivided into 442 villages, comprising 421 rural desa and 21 urban kelurahan. The kelurahan comprise all 11 villages in Kota Garut, 4 of the 20 villages in  Karangpawitan, 5 of the 12 villages in Tarogong Kidul and 1 of the 13 villages in Tarogong Kaler. Cibalong District is the largest district and covers 6.97% of the area of all Garut Regency districts, while the Kersamanah District is the smallest, with an area of 1,650 ha or 0.54%. Garut constitutes the buffer land and hinterland for the development of Bandung Raja's territory. It has a strategic position and acts as the supplier for the needs of Bandung Municipality and Bandung Regency's populations.

The Garut Regency has two distinct topographical areas:
Northern Garut consists of highlands and mountainous terrain, which have the largest rice fields of Garut
Southern Garut is mostly made out of downward sloping lands, along with twelve main rivers which flow south into the Sunda Trough, an area of  oceanic crust near the southern coast of Java that is part of the larger Indian Ocean.

Tourist resorts are well-established in Garut Regency, with coastal views, and others with craters, waterfalls, lakes and a hot springs.

History

On March 2, 1811, the Balubur Limbangan Regency was defeated by Governor General Herman W. Daendels (of the Dutch Colonial Army), and Regent Tumenggung Wangsakusumah II resigned. Balubur Limbangan Regency then comprised 6 districts: Balubur, Malangbong, Wanaraja, Wanakerta, Cibeureum and Papandak.

On February 16, 1813, a new Limbangan Regency was founded by Lt. Governor Sir Stamford Raffles which became Garut Regency. R.A.A. Adiwijaya was the first Regent of Garut Regency. He governed from 1813 until 1821. He was well known for his call of Dalem Cipeujeuh.

Localities
 

Garsela

Local produce
Land fertility varies greatly because of influence by mountains, rivers and coastal lowlands. As a result, agricultural businesses are primarily plantation-based, as well as subsistence farming and animal husbandry, followed by forest resources.

Some known products from Garut are:
 Garut Orange fruits (Jeruk Garut)
 Mangdogars Handycraft "Mang Dogar" as Garut Icon likes ornament, dolls, souvenir, clothes
 Garut Lamb (Domba Garut)
 Dodol Garut (a snack)
 Vetiver Root Oil (Andropogon zizanioides)
 Batik Tulis Garutan (hand painted clothes)
 Silk clothes
 Gemstones
 Leather crafts
 Bamboo crafts

Tourism in Garut
Garut is known as Zwitserse van Java (Switzerland of Java). It has so many tourist attractions divided into several tourism zone units (Indonesian: Satuan Kawasan Wisata (SKW)):
 Cangkuang TZU including Paragliding Mount Haruman, Cikembulan Zoo, Cimandi Racun Waterfall, Cangkuang Lake, Cangkuang Temple, Jafar Umar Sidiq Tomb, 
 Cipanas TZU including Bagendit Lake, Citiis Waterfall, Mount Guntur, Cipanas Water Park
 Darajat Crater TZU including Darajat Crater and water parks around.
 Mbah Godog Tomb TZU including Godog Tomb, Linggaratu Tomb, Cinunuk Tomb, Talaga Bodas, 
 Ngamplang TZU including Cihanyawar Waterfall, Flamboyan Golf Course, Dayeuh Manggung Tea Plantation, 
 Pameungpeuk TZU including Darmaga Beach, Manulusu Beach, Gunung Geder, Santolo Beach, Neglasari Beach, Sayang Heulang Beach
 Papandayan TZU including Cimmanuk River Rafting, Ciburuy Site, Curug Orok, Papandayan Crater, 
 Rancabuaya TZU including Rancabuaya Beach, Cikandang River Rafting, Sanghiyang Taraje Waterfall, 
 Sancang TZU including Sancang Forest, Cijeruk Indah Beach and Karang Paranje Beach

References

Bibliography

External links

Official District Government site (English)